Philip Davison (born 1957 in Dublin, Ireland) is an Irish novelist, screenwriter and playwright.  He is perhaps best known for his series of spy novels which follow Harry Fielding's activities as an understrapper for the MI5. His most recent novel is Eureka Dunes, published by Liberties Press in 2017. Quiet City will be published in March 2020, and The Makeweight in 2022.

Harry Fielding novels

 Crooked Man (1997)
 McKenzie’s Friend (2000)
 The Long Suit (2003)
 A Burnable Town (2006)

Other books

 The Book-Thief’s Heartbeat (1981)
 Twist and Shout (1983)
 The Illustrator (1988)

Film and drama

Philip Davison's play, The Invisible Mending Company (Dublin, The Abbey Theatre, Peacock Stage) was first produced in 1996.

He has co-scripted the film dramas Exposure and Criminal Conversation.

Crooked Man was made into a TV drama in 2003.

His radio plays include Being Perfect (2004); The Duke (2004); Lennon’s Guitar (2005); and The Fishmonger (2006).

References

External links

1957 births
Living people
Aosdána members